David and Jonathan is a 1920 British silent adventure film directed by Alexander Butler and starring Madge Titheradge, Geoffrey Webb, and Dick Ryan. It was based on a novel by E. Temple Thurston. It was made at Universal City in California. Two men, David and Jonathan, are shipwrecked on a desert island together with a girl with whom they are both in love.

Cast
 Madge Titheradge as Joan Meredith 
 Geoffrey Webb as David Mortlake 
 Richard Ryan as Jonathan Hawksley 
 Sydney Wood as David, as a child 
 Jack Perks as David as a child

References

Bibliography
 Low, Rachael. History of the British Film, 1918-1929. George Allen & Unwin, 1971.

External links

1920 films
1920 adventure films
British adventure films
British silent feature films
Films directed by Alexander Butler
Films based on Irish novels
Films set in England
Seafaring films
British black-and-white films
1920s English-language films
1920s British films
Silent adventure films